Cuckoo is a British sitcom that began airing on BBC Three on 25 September 2012, repeating on BBC One, and in 2016 began airing worldwide on Netflix.

Written by Robin French and Kieron Quirke, Cuckoo stars Andy Samberg, Taylor Lautner, Andie MacDowell, Greg Davies, Tamla Kari, Esther Smith, Tyger Drew-Honey, Helen Baxendale, Matt Lacey and Kenneth Collard. The series launch became BBC Three's most-watched comedy launch, beating the record set by Bad Education, which debuted the previous month. Greg Davies was nominated for a BAFTA for Best Male Performance in a Comedy Programme. At the British Comedy Awards, Cuckoo was nominated for Best New Comedy Programme and Greg Davies was nominated for Best TV Comedy Actor.

Production 
Following the success of series one, the BBC ordered a second series, but it looked uncertain due to Samberg's busy schedule. In February 2014, it was announced that Samberg would not return for the second series, with Taylor Lautner replacing him as Cuckoo's long-lost lovechild Dale. The second series began on 7 August 2014. On 4 April 2016, Cuckoo was commissioned for two more series. Series 4 wrapped up production on 18 March 2018, confirmed by Lautner via social media. It was released on 2 August 2018.

A pilot for America's NBC television network was under consideration in May 2015.

The show is filmed in the town of Amersham (including the historic 'old town' area), and the adjoining village of Chesham Bois in Buckinghamshire. Some of the outside scenes are also filmed in and around Chesham, Chartridge, Farnham, and Thame Oxfordshire.

Plot

Series 1

Cuckoo is set in Lichfield, Staffordshire, (external scenes are mostly filmed in Farnham, Surrey, Slough, Berkshire, and Amersham, Buckinghamshire,  all approximately 100 miles south of Lichfield), home to the Thompson family. When Ken (Davies) and Lorna (Baxendale) collect their daughter Rachel (Kari) from the airport, they learn that she has returned from her gap year before medical school having married Dale "Cuckoo" Ashbrick (Samberg), an eccentric American hippie with an exuberantly loving attitude who does not have a job and loves to take drugs.

Series 2

Two years have passed and Cuckoo has gone missing in a climbing accident in the Himalayas, Dylan (Drew-Honey) is planning to attend university, and Rachel (now played by Esther Smith) is moving in with new boyfriend Ben (Lacey). Dale (Lautner), a bearded young American arrives, claiming to be Cuckoo's son and searching for his father whom he has never met. Taking pity, Ken and Lorna ask him to stay.

Series 3

Six months after Dale's dramatic departure at the end of the Christmas special of Series 2, Rachel is still heartbroken and missing Dale, but she has managed to salvage a certain friendship with her jilted former fiancé Ben (Lacey). Just as life looks like it is about to return to normal in the Thompson household, a transformed Dale returns to shake things up all over again after having spent some time working for a Chinese 'businessman' in Shanghai. Meanwhile, Ken and Lorna are preparing for the birth of their unplanned new baby, and their son Dylan (Drew-Honey) is getting ready to leave for university. In the first episode, Lorna gives birth to their baby son Sidney.

Series 4

Dale and Steve work towards opening a bar called 'All Steve's Pals'. Rachel gets offered a job in Sierra Leone.

Series 4 was released, in full, online on BBC Three on 2 August 2018 with the opening episode titled "Lawyer of the Year".

Series 5

Series 5 introduces a new character, Ivy (Andie MacDowell), who comes to the UK from America with a slightly sinister plan. Dale (Taylor Lautner) does not appear in Series 5. His absence is not explained, with Rachel just telling Sid that "Dale is gone". After meeting a strange lady in a pub, Ken decides to run for Lichfield MP.

Series 5 was released in full, online on BBC Three on 4 January 2019 with the opening episode titled “Ivy Arrives”.

Cast and characters 

Key
  = Main cast (actor receives "Starring" credit that series) 
  = Recurring cast (actor appears in two or more episodes that series)
  = Guest (actor who has appeared in another series of Cuckoo but only made 1 appearance in this series)

Notes:
 Only named characters appear in the table above.
 Only characters that have appeared in more than two episodes in a single series appear in the table above.

Episodes

Series 1 (2012)

Series 2 (2014)

Series 3 (2016)

Series 4 (2018)

Series 5 (2019)
Netflix premiered series 1 and 2 for streaming audiences on 7 March 2016. Series 3 was subsequently added on 16 February 2017. Series 4 was subsequently added on 14 December 2018. Series 5 was subsequently added on 19 April 2019.

DVD release

Soundtracks
Series 1
In the episode "Family Meeting", family and friends are dancing to "Second Hand News" by Fleetwood Mac.

In the episode "Ken on E", Cuckoo sits reading a book whilst listening to "Shake Break Bounce" by The Chemical Brothers. In the same episode, various songs by Dexys Midnight Runners are featured. Also "Bonkers" by Dizzee Rascal.

The song playing over the last scene and credits of the episode "The Wedding", is "Ho Hey" by The Lumineers. On Netflix it is "Stay Right Here" by Andy Huckvale.

Series 2
In the episode "Potato Party", "Everyone Nose (All the Girls Standing in the Line for the Bathroom)" by N.E.R.D and "Mishto" by Gogol Bordello are featured during the party.

Rachel is listening to "Silver Lining" by First Aid Kit in the episode "Tribunal".

Series 3
The final episode, "The Holiday", ends with Rusted Root singing "Send Me on My Way". On Netflix this song is replaced due to BBC licensing agreements.

Series 4

In "Lawyer of the Year", "Think I'm in Love" by Eddie Money play's during the opening dance number.

In "Opening Night", "Don't You (Forget About Me)" by Simple Minds plays in All Steve's Pals while Lorna tells Dale about Rachel's plans to move to Sierra Leone. The final scene has "Modern Love" by David Bowie playing. Dale mixes cocktails to WOR by Django Django.

In "Trapped", a section from "The Number One Song in Heaven" by Sparks when Dale reveals to Rachel that he found out about her “pregnancy”.

Lorna and Connie listen to "Insane in the Brain" by Cypress Hill after Lorna tells Connie that Ken cheated on her with an air hostess.

U.S. version
In May 2015, NBC announced a US pilot of Cuckoo, starring Michael Chiklis, Cheryl Hines, and Flula Borg, was to be produced. UK writers Robin French and Kieron Quirke, who created the BBC series, wrote the adaptation with The Simpsons veteran Tim Long. The project was not picked up as a series.

References

External links

2012 British television series debuts
2019 British television series endings
2010s British sitcoms
BBC television sitcoms
English-language television shows
Lichfield
Television series about dysfunctional families
Television series about marriage
Television series about siblings
Television series about widowhood
Television shows set in Staffordshire